Kamran Farooque (born 2 December 1995) is an Indian professional footballer who plays as a defender for I-League club Churchill Brothers.

Club career
Born in West Bengal, Farooque played for Ozone before joining local side Mohammedan. Prior to the 2019–20 season, Farooque was named the club's campaign.

Churchill Brothers
On 1 August 2020, it was announced that Farooque had joined I-League club Churchill Brothers. He made his professional debut for the club on 10 January 2021 against Indian Arrows, playing 88 minutes in a 5–2 victory.

Career statistics

References

External links
 at the Mohammedan website

1995 births
Living people
People from West Bengal
Indian footballers
Association football defenders
Ozone FC players
Mohammedan SC (Kolkata) players
Churchill Brothers FC Goa players
I-League players
Footballers from West Bengal
I-League 2nd Division players
Calcutta Football League players